Swedish Collegium for Advanced Study (SCAS) is an institute for advanced study in Uppsala, Sweden. It is one of the ten member institutions of the Some Institutes for Advanced Study consortium, which brings together the world's most distinguished institutes for advanced study. SCAS is also a member of the European network of institutes for advanced study NetIAS.

The Collegium was founded in 1985, chartered by the Swedish government and offers one-semester and one-year fellowships to visiting scholars, ranging from postdoctoral to professorial positions. Since January 2007, it is located in the Linneanum in the Uppsala University Botanical Garden. It was earlier located in a villa in the Kåbo district of Uppsala.

External links
Swedish Collegium for Advanced Study, official website
NetIAS, NetIAS, official website

Uppsala University
Research institutes established in 1985
Research institutes in Sweden
Social science institutes
Institute for Advanced Study
1985 establishments in Sweden